Küçüktekke  is a village in Alaplı District, Zonguldak Province, Turkey.

References

Villages in Alaplı District